The Roman Catholic Diocese of Kottar is a Latin rite suffragan diocese in the ecclesiastical province of,    Kottar, Kanyakumari District, southern India yet depends on the missionary Roman Congregation for the Evangelization of Peoples

Its episcopal see is Cathedral of St. Francis Xavier at Kottar in the town of Nagercoil, Tamil Nadu. It was built by St. Francis Xavier in 1544 AD, rebuilt in 1603 over the small chapel original chapel, expanded in both 1713 and 1806.

Antecedents 
The Kottar parish was a constituent of Malabar Vicariate since 1657 AD and came under Roman Catholic Archdiocese of Verapoly. Again it became the southern center of Diocese of Quilon at its erection in 1853 AD.

Saints and causes for canonisation
 Devasahayam Pillai, a lay martyr of the Christian faith, was born (1712 AD) and martyred (1752 AD) here. His remains are buried in the cathedral of the diocese.

History 
 Established on 26 May 1930 as Diocese of Kottar / Kottaren(sis) (Latin), on territory split off from the Diocese of Quilon.
 Due to linguistic reasons as per reorganization of States, Kottar diocese was formally detached from the Metropolitan Archdiocese of Verapoly (in Kerala) and made suffragan of the Roman Catholic Archdiocese of Madurai (Tamil Nadu) instead in 1963.
 Lost territory on 2014.12.22 to establish the Diocese of Kuzhithurai.

Episcopal ordinaries
Suffragan Bishops of Kottar
(all Roman Rite natives)

 ?Aloysius Benziger
 Lorenzo (Lawrence) Pereira (26 May 1930 – death 7 January 1938)
 Thomas Roch Agniswami, Society of Jesus (S.J.) (5 January 1939 – retired 23 November 1970), died 1974
 Marianus Arokiasamy (23 November 1970 – 3 July 1987), next Metropolitan Archbishop of Madurai (India) (1987.07.03 – retired 2003.03.22), also vice-president of Conference of Catholic Bishops of India (1991 – 1993 & 1994 – 1996), President of Conference of Catholic Bishops of India (1997 – 1999), died 2007 
 Leon Augustine Tharmaraj (14 November 1988 – death 16 January 2007)
 Peter Remigius (30 June 2007 – retired 20 May 2017.05.20), previously Bishop of Kumbakonam (Tamil Nadu, India) (1989.11.10 – 2007.06.30)
 Nazarene Soosai (2017.05.20 – ...), nor previous prelature

Statistics 
As per 2017, it pastorally serves 307,104 Catholics on 750 km2 in 95 parishes with 243 priests (208 diocesan, 35 religious), 480 lay religious (35 brothers, 445 sisters) and 42 seminarians.

See also 
 List of Catholic dioceses in India

References

Sources and external links 
 
 GCatholic, with Google satellite photo - data for all sections

Roman Catholic dioceses in India
Religious organizations established in 1930
Roman Catholic dioceses and prelatures established in the 20th century
Christianity in Tamil Nadu